Chandu Lal Malhotra (1766 – 15 April 1845 ), better known as Maharaja Chandu Lal was the prime minister (1833–1844) for 3rd Nizam of Hyderabad Sikandar Jah. He was born in Hyderabad Deccan (now Hyderabad, India) and hails from a family from Raebareli, India. He was also a poet of Urdu, Hyderabadi, Punjabi and Persian.

Family 
Chandu Lal Sadan's was born in an Arora Malhotra family. Another states he was from a Hindu Khatri background. His father was Rai Naryen Das, who migrated from Rai Bareilly to Hyderabad State,. His ancestors were Hindus. who served in the Mughal courts. His family is the founder of the Dafter-e-Mal (Department of Finance) in Hyderabad Deccan during Nizam ul Mulk Asif Jah I. The future prime minister, Maharaja Sir Kishen Pershad, was his great-grandson. The family is famously known as Malwala Family in Hyderabad, India,

In Sikh Darbar 
Chandu Shah was a Minister within the court of Maharaja Ranjit Singh under the Sikh Empire. They both had good relations and Chandu Lal Malotra became a General in the Sikh Khalsa Army. He then converted and became a devout Sehajdhari Sikh.

In an agreement between Maharaja Ranjit Singh and the Nizam of Hyderabad for the construction of a Gurudwara in the spot where Guru Gobind Singh Ji died and the Nizam of Hyderabad making it 4 acres large made of marble, Ranjit Singh would give him 24,000 Nihang Sikhs as private unpaid soldiers to quell rebellions.

Chandu Lal may have considered himself a Nanakpanthi, as he was devotee of the Udasi saint, Baba Priyatam Das.

In Nizam Darbar 
He started his career as a subordinate in the customs department of Kingdom of Hyderabad. Later he received the title of Raja Bahadur from Nawab Sikandar Jah. Sikandar Jah selected him as accounts officer of his army. British historian states "Due to the ladting effect of Chundoo Lal the dominions of the Nizam seem to look like a Sikh one rather than a Mohhamedan." The Nihang forces refused to be paid and said they would only be paid by the Akal Takht. Later after the Anglo Sikh Wars Nihangs fled to the South, where they battled against revolt earning respect by many. It is even noted by historians that Nihangs were used as bodyguards.
In 1819 Chandu Lal received the title of Maharaja from Sikandar Jah and a cash award of one crore rupees. In 1822 he was made the head of seven thousand horsemen with the title of Raja e Rajagan from Nawab Nasir ud dawlah. After the death of Monir-ul-Mulk in 1833, Chandu Lal succeeded him as a prime minister.

Prime minister
Chandu Lal was made prime minister of Hyderabad Deccan twice. First in the year 1808 then in 1832 AD and he held the office until 1843 AD.

Poet
Chandu Lal (who used the pen name "Sadan") as a learned man, was a patron of Urdu poetry and literature. His patronship attracted Urdu poets to his court. He even invited poets from Northern India like Zauq and Baksh Nasikh from Delhi to Hyderabad State but they couldn't turn up for some reasons. Despite the responsibility of his prime ministerial office he used to regularly organize and attend Mushaira.

See also
Vitthal Sundar
Prime Ministers of Hyderabad State

References 

People from Hyderabad State
Prime Ministers of Hyderabad State
Indian Hindus
1845 deaths
1766 births
People from Raebareli
18th-century male writers
Urdu-language poets from India
Poets from Uttar Pradesh
18th-century Indian poets
19th-century Indian poets
Indian male poets